Franz Heinrich Kaiser (25 April 1891 – 13 March 1962) was a German astronomer.

He worked at the Heidelberg-Königstuhl Observatory from 1911 to 1914 while working on his Ph.D. there, which he obtained in 1915. During this time, Heidelberg was a center of asteroid discovery, and Kaiser discovered 21 asteroids during his time there.

The outer main-belt asteroid 3183 Franzkaiser was named in his memory on 1 September 1993.

References 
 

1891 births
1962 deaths
Discoverers of asteroids

20th-century German astronomers
Scientists from Wiesbaden